Victoria Noelia Bustos (born 7 January 1989) is an Argentine professional boxer. She is a two-weight world champion, having held the IBF female lightweight title from 2013 to 2018 and the IBF female light welterweight title in 2019. She also challenged once for the undisputed female welterweight title in 2019.

Professional career
Bustos won the vacant IBF female lightweight title on 21 September 2013, with a unanimous decision (UD) win over Ana Esteche. She successfully retained the title five times, defeating Roxana Laborde, Natalia Aguirre (who had defeated Bustos twice prior in non-title matches), Claudia Lopez, Kimberly Connor, and Maria Capriolo, before losing the title to WBA champion Katie Taylor in a unification match on 28 April 2018.

Professional boxing record

External links

1989 births
Living people
Argentine women boxers
Lightweight boxers
International Boxing Federation champions